Srikalahasti Temple is located in the town of Srikalahasti, in Tirupati district in the state of Andhra Pradesh, India. It is one of the most famous Shiva temples in South India, and is said to be the site where Kannappa was ready to offer both his eyes to cover blood flowing from the linga before Shiva stopped him and granted him moksha.

Srikalahasti temple, situated 36 km away from Tirupati is famous for its Vayu Lingam (Wind Lingam), one of the Panchabhoota Sthalams, representing wind. The temple is also regarded as Rahu-Ketu kshetra and Dakshina Kailasam. The inner temple was constructed around 5th century and the outer temple was constructed in the 11th century by the Rajendra Chola I, later Chola kings and the Vijayanagara kings. Shiva in his aspect as Vayu is worshiped as Kalahasteeswara.

Legend
In primordial times, the wind-god Vayu performed penance for thousands of years to the Karpoora lingam, the lingam of Shiva made of camphor. Pleased with Vayu's penance, Shiva manifested before him and bestowed him three boons. Vayu was blessed to present everywhere in the world in form of air and want to be an integral part of every being in form of vayus. Further, The linga Vayu worshipped was named as Vayu lingam after him and was declared to be worshipped by various beings.

Another legend narrates that Shiva's consort Parvati who was cursed by him to discard her divine form and assume human form. To atone, Parvati performed penance at Srikalahasti and pleased Shiva. Shiva granted her a heavenly body, a hundred times better than her previous divine form. Parvati is worshipped as Shiva-Gnanam Gnana Prasunamba or Gnana Prasunambika Devi in the temple.

Cursed to become a ghost, Ghanakala prayed at Srikalahasti for 15 years and after chanting the Bhairava Mantra, Shiva restored her original form. 

Mayura, Chandra and Devendra were also freed from their curses after taking bath in the river Swarnamukhi and praying at Srikalahasti. 

Shiva appeared before the sage Markandeya in Srikalahasti and preached that a Guru alone could make esoteric teachings and, therefore he is Brahma, Vishnu and Maheswara.

As per another legend, Vayu and Shesha had a dispute to find out who is superior, to prove the superiority Shesha encircled Mount Kailash, the abode of Shiva, Vayu tried to remove this encircle by creating a twister. Because of the twister, 8 parts of the mountain fell into 8 different places which are Trincomalee, Srikalahasti, Thiruchiramalai, Thiruenkoimalai, Rajathagiri, Neerthagiri,  Ratnagiri, and Suwethagiri Thirupangeeli.

History
Around the 11th century, the Chola king Rajendra Chola I king renovated the temple and constructed the main structure. The temple received contributions from various ruling dynasties like Chola Dynasty and Vijayanagar Empire.

The main gopuram built by the king Krishnadevaraya, collapsed on 26 May 2010.  As per the Archaeology Department, the temple tower stood on a foundation that had a depth of only one-and-a-half feet and had a thin crack 25 years before it collapsed which expanded as years passed by. The Rajagopuram was reconstructed in its original form at the same location with a budget of 45 crores and was consecrated on 18 January 2017.

Architecture
 
The presiding image of Shiva in the form of Linga is made of white stone in a shape resembling trunk of elephant. The temple faces south, while the sanctum faces west. The temple is located on the foothills of a hill, while there is also a belief that the temple was carved out of a monolithic hill. Vallaba Ganapathi, Mahalakshmi-Ganpathi and Sahasra Lingeswara are some of the rare images found in the temple. There is a large shrine of Jnanaprasanammba, the consort of Kalahatisvara. There are smaller shrines in the temple for Kasi Viswanatha, Annapurna, Suryanarayana, Sadyoganapathi and Subramanya. There are two large halls namely Sadyogi Mandapa and Jalkoti Mandapa. There are two water bodies associated with the namely, Surya Pushkarani and Chandra Pushkarani.

Religious importance
The temple is revered as one of the Pancha Bhoota Stalam where the presiding deity is worshipped as Vayu linga (air).
This temple is considered "Kashi of the South". Saivaite saints of the first century sang about this temple. This is the only temple in India which remains open during Solar and lunar eclipses, while, all other temples are closed. This temple is famous for Rahu-Kethu pooja. It is believed that performing this pooja will ward the people from astrological effects of Rahu and Kethu.
As per Hindu legend, Kalahasteeshwara was worshipped at this place by Brahma during all four Yugas. Arjuna, the Pandava prince during Mahabharata is believed to have worshipped the presiding deity. The legend of Kannappa, who was a hunter and turned into an ardent devotee of Shiva accidentally, is associated with the temple. The temple  also finds mention in the works of Nakeerar and the Nalvars, namely, Appar, Sundarar, Sambandar and Manickavasagar in the canonical works of Tirumura. As the temple is revered in Tevaram, it is classified as Paadal Petra Sthalam, one of the 275 temples that find mention in the Saiva canon.

Culture
The temple follows Saivite tradition. Maha Shivaratri is the most important festival when lakhs of devotees offer prayers to seek the blessings of the Lord. Mahasivaratri Brahmotsavams are celebrated in par with Maha Shivaratri for 13 days during which the Utsava murtis of Siva and Parvati will be taken on Vahanams in a procession around the temple streets.

The presiding deity of the temple Gnana Prasunambika Devi was born in Vellathurar Gotra of Senguntha Kaikolar. Customary for the bride to bring home the dowry and submit it by these Vellathurar peoples at the Shiva-Parvati wedding held here.

References

External links

 Srikalahasti

Shiva temples in Andhra Pradesh
Pancha Bhoota Stalam
Devi temples in Andhra Pradesh
5th-century Hindu temples
12th-century Hindu temples
Chola architecture
Pallava dynasty
Vijayanagara Empire
Pallava architecture
Padal Petra Stalam